Berayjan (also Romanized as Berāyjān and Barāyjān; also known as Barāi Jūn) is a village in Aliabad Rural District, Khafr District, Jahrom County, Fars Province, Iran. At the 2015 census, its population was 2,708, in 517families.

References 

Populated places in  Jahrom County